Velon Leo John OBE is a Saint Lucian politician who represented the Laborie constituency for the Saint Lucia Labour Party. He served as the Minister for Labour Relations, Public Service and Co-operatives. He stood down before the general election of 11 December 2006.

References

Living people
Officers of the Order of the British Empire
Members of the House of Assembly of Saint Lucia
Saint Lucia Labour Party politicians
Year of birth missing (living people)